The STEP ISO 10303 Application modules define common building blocks to create modular Application Protocols (AP) within ISO 10303. Higher-level modules are built up from lower-level modules. 

The modules on the lowest level are wrappers of concepts, defined in the Integrated Resources (IR) or Application Integrated Constructs (AIC). Modules on a medium level link lower level modules with each other and specialize them. Only modules on the highest levels completely cover a particular area so that they can be implemented.

See also
 List of STEP (ISO 10303) parts

References
 SMRL Table of content iso.org

Computer-aided design
Application Modules